Trigonocephaly is a congenital condition of premature fusion of the metopic suture (from the Greek , "forehead"), leading to a triangular forehead. The merging of the two frontal bones leads to transverse growth restriction and parallel growth expansion. It may occur syndromic, involving other abnormalities, or isolated.

Cause

Trigonocephaly can either occur syndromatic or isolated. Trigonocephaly is associated with the following syndromes: Opitz syndrome, Muenke syndrome, Jacobsen syndrome, Baller–Gerold syndrome and Say–Meyer syndrome. The etiology of trigonocephaly is mostly unknown although there are three main theories. Trigonocephaly is probably a multifactorial congenital condition, but due to limited proof of these theories this cannot safely be concluded.

Intrinsic bone malformation
The first theory assumes that the origin of pathological synostosis lies within disturbed bone formation early on in the pregnancy. Causes can either be genetic (9p22–24, 11q23, 22q11, FGFR1 mutation), metabolic (TSH suppletion in hypothyroidism) or pharmaceutical (valproate in epilepsy).

Fetal-head constraint
The second theory says that synostosis begins when the fetal head gets hindered in the pelvic outlet during birth.

Intrinsic brain malformation
The third theory predominates disturbed brain formation of the two frontal lobes as the main issue behind synostosis. Limited growth of the frontal lobes leads to an absence of stimuli for cranial growth, therefore causing premature fusion of the metopic suture.

Other conditions and syndromes 
Other conditions and syndromes with trigonocephaly include:

 11q partial monosomy syndrome
 3p- syndrome
 46,XY sex reversal
 Arthrogryposis, cleft palate, craniosynostosis, and impaired intellectual development
 Atypical glycine encephalopathy
 Baraitser-Winter syndrome
 Blepharophimosis-intellectual disability syndrome, Verloes type
 Bohring-Opitz syndrome
 C syndrome
 Chromosome 13q33-q34 deletion syndrome
 Chromosome 1q41-q42 deletion syndrome
 Chromosome 9p deletion syndrome
 Coffin-Siris syndrome
 Craniosynostosis and dental anomalies
 Developmental delay with short stature, dysmorphic facial features, and sparse hair
 Frontoocular syndrome
 Greig cephalopolysyndactyly syndrome
 Hao-Fountain syndrome
 Holoprosencephaly
 Intellectual disability, X-linked
 Intellectual disability, X-linked syndromic, Turner type
 Mandibulofacial dysostosis-microcephaly syndrome
 MEGF8-related Carpenter syndrome
 Microcephaly, primary autosomal dominant
 Mucolipidosis type II
 Orofaciodigital syndrome type 14
 Paris-Trousseau thrombocytopenia
 Potocki-Lupski syndrome
 Pyruvate dehydrogenase E3-binding protein deficiency
 Saldino-Mainzer syndrome
 Sandestig-Stefanova syndrome
 Severe feeding difficulties-failure to thrive-microcephaly due to ASXL3 deficiency syndrome
 Short stature-craniofacial anomalies-genital hypoplasia syndrome
 Sifrim-Hitz-Weiss syndrome
 Simpson-Golabi-Behmel syndrome type 1
 Trichothiodystrophy, photosensitive
 Trigonocephaly-bifid nose-acral anomalies syndrome
 Trigonocephaly-short stature-developmental delay syndrome

Diagnosis
Diagnosis can be characterized by typical facial and cranial deformities.

Observatory signs of trigonocephaly are:
 a triangular forehead seen from top view leading to a smaller anterior cranial fossa
 a visible and palpable midline ridge
 hypotelorism inducing ethmoidal hypoplasia

Imaging techniques (3D-CT, Röntgenography, MRI) show:
 epicanthal folds in limited cases
 teardrop-shaped orbits angulated towards the midline of the forehead ('surprised coon' sign) in severe cases
 a contrast difference between a röntgenograph of a normal and a trigonocephalic skull
 anterior curving of the metopic suture seen from lateral view of the cranium on a röntgenograph
 a normal cephalic index (maximum cranium width / maximum cranium length) however, there is bitemporal shortening and biparietal broadening

The neuropsychological development is not always affected. These effects are only visible in a small percentage of children with trigonocephaly or other suture synostoses.

Neuropsychological signs are:
 problems in behaviour, speech and language
 mental retardation
 neurodevelopmental delays such as attention deficit hyperactivity disorder (ADHD), oppositional defiant disorder (ODD), autism spectrum disorder (ASD), and conduct disorder (CD). Many of these delays become evident at school age.

Treatment
Treatment is surgical with attention to form and volume. Surgery usually takes place before the age of one since it has been reported that the intellectual outcome is better.

Fronto-supraorbital advancement and remodelling
A form of surgery is the so-called fronto-supraorbital advancement and remodelling. Firstly, the supraorbital bar is remodelled by a wired greenstick fracture to straighten it. Secondly, the supraorbital bar is moved 2 cm. forward and fixed only to the frontal process of the zygoma without fixation to the cranium. Lastly, the frontal bone is divided into two, rotated and attached to the supraorbital bar causing a nude area (craniectomy) between the parietal bone and frontal bone. Bone will eventually regenerate since the dura mater lies underneath (the dura mater has osteogenic capabilities). This results in an advancement and straightening of the forehead.

'Floating forehead technique'
The so-called 'floating forehead technique' combined with the remodelling of the supraorbital bar is derived from the fronto-supraorbital advancement and remodelling. The supraorbital bar is remodelled as described above. The frontal bone is split in two pieces. Instead of using both pieces as in fronto-supraorbital advancement and remodelling, only one piece is rotated and attached to the supraorbital bar. This technique also leaves a craniectomy behind.

Other
 Suturectomy

 Distraction osteogenesis

 Minimal invasive endoscopic surgery

These approaches are 2D solutions for a 3D problem, therefore the results are not optimal. Distraction osteogenesis and minimal invasive endoscopic surgery are yet in experimental phase.

Outcomes

Surgical
Trigonocephaly seems to be the most compliant form of craniosynostosis for surgery. Because of standardization of current surgical approaches there is no surgical mortality and complications are few to none.
The simple suturectomy is presently insufficient to adjust the complicated growth restrictions caused by metopic synostosis. On the other hand, the fronto-supraorbital advancement and remodelling and the 'floating forehead technique' create sufficient space for brain growth and result in a normal horizontal axis of the orbits and supraorbital bar. The fronto-supraorbital advancement and remodelling is the most used method nowadays.
Over the past few years distraction osteogenesis has been gradually acknowledged since it has a positive effect on hypotelorism. Expanding the distance between the orbits using springs seems to be successful. However, there are discussions whether hypotelorism really needs to be corrected.
The minimal invasive endoscopic surgery has been gaining attention since the early '90s, however, it has technical limitations (only strip craniectomy is possible). Attempts have been made to reach beyond these limits.

Aesthetic
Aesthetic outcome of metopic  synostosis surgery is persistently good with reoperation hazards below 20%. In 1981 Anderson advised that craniofacial operations for synostosis should be as extensive as necessary after a study of 107 cases of metopic and coronal synostosis. Surgery does not provide a 100% natural outcome, mostly there will be minor irregularities. Reoperations are usually performed on more severe cases (including syndromic metopic synostosis). The hypotelorism  and temporal hollowing are the most difficult to correct: the hypotelorism usually remains under corrected and a second operation is often needed for correction of temporal hollowing.

Neurological
The highest rate of neurological problems of single suture synostosis are seen in patients with trigonocephaly. Surgery is performed generally before the age of one because of claims of better intellectual outcome. Seemingly surgery does not influence the high incidence of neurodevelopment problems in patients with metopic synostosis. Neurological disorders such as ADHD, ASD, ODD and CD are seen in patients with trigonocephaly. These disorders are usually also associated with decreased IQ. The presence of ADHD, ASD and ODD is higher in cases with an IQ below 85. This is not the case with CD which showed an insignificant increase at an IQ below 85.

Epidemiology
The incidence of metopic synostosis is roughly between 1:700 and 1:15,000 newborns globally (differs per country). Trigonocephaly is seen more in males than females ranging from 2:1 to 6.5:1. Hereditary relations in metopic synostosis have been found of which 5.5% were well defined syndromic. Maternal age and a birth weight of less than 2500g may also play a role in trigonocephaly. These data are based on estimations and do not give factual information.

Only one article gives valuable and reliable information regarding the incidence of metopic synostosis in the Netherlands. The incidence in the Netherlands showed an increase from 0.6 (1997) to 1.9 (2007) for every 10,000 live births.

History
In former times people born with malformed skulls were rejected based upon their appearance. This still persists today in various parts of the world even though the intellectual development is often normal. The Austrian physician Franz Joseph Gall presented the science of phrenology in the early 19th century through his work The Anatomy and Physiology of the Nervous System in General, and of the Brain in Particular.

Hippocrates described trigonocephaly as follows: Men's heads are by no means all like to one another, nor are the sutures of the head of all men constructed in the same form. Thus, whoever has a prominence in the anterior part of the head (by prominence is meant the round protuberant part of the bone which projects beyond the rest of it), in him the sutures of the head take the form of the Greek letter 'tau', τ.

Hermann Welcker coined the term trigonocephaly in 1862. He described a child with a V-shaped skull and a cleft lip.

Popular culture
Via a photo shown on a Facebook page, the mother of a child previously diagnosed with this condition recognised the symptoms and reported them to the family involved, resulting in an immediate diagnosis that medical professionals had overlooked in all earlier consultations.

References

External links 

Congenital disorders of musculoskeletal system